The 2008 World Championship of Ski Mountaineering was the fourth World Championship of Ski Mountaineering sanctioned by the International Council for Ski Mountaineering Competitions (ISMC), held in Portes du Soleil, Switzerland, from February 23 to February 29, 2008.

About 450 athletes of 29 nations participated. Compared to the former world masterships a long distance race was added.

Results

Nation ranking and medals 
(without long distance ranking; all age groups)

Individual 
Event held in Valerette on February 24, 2008
 starting point: Les Cerniers/Monthey
 altitude difference:
 ascent: 1,650m
 downhill: 1,650m

List of the best 10 participants by gender (incl. "Espoirs" level):

Relay 
event held in Morgins on February 25, 2008

 altitude difference (ascent): 260m

List of the best 10 relay teams by gender (some teams included "Espoirs" level athletes):

Team 
event held in Pointe de l'Au on February 26, 2008

 altitude difference:
 ascent: 1,940m
 downhill: 2,125m

List of the best 10 relay teams by gender (some teams included "Espoirs" level athletes):

Vertical race 
event held on February 28, 2008

 altitude difference (ascent): 870m

List of the best 10 participants by gender (incl. "Espoirs" level):

Long distance 
event held on February 29, 2008

 altitude difference
 ascent (men / women): 3,200m / 2,500m
 downhill (men / women): 3,200m / 2,700m

List of the best 10 participants by gender:

Combination ranking 
(vertical race, individual and team ranking)

List of the best 10 participants by gender:

References 

2008
World Championship Of Ski Mountaineering, 2008
International sports competitions hosted by Switzerland
Skimountaineering
Skiing competitions in Switzerland